Chromogobius zebratus, Kolombatovic's goby, is a species of goby found in the Mediterranean and Adriatic Seas where they occur in shallow coastal waters.  This species can reach a length of  SL.

References

Chromogobius
Fish of the Adriatic Sea
Fish of the Mediterranean Sea
Fish of Europe
Fish described in 1891
Taxa named by Juraj Kolombatović